Podisma is a genus of 'short-horned grasshoppers' belonging to the family Acrididae and the subfamily Melanoplinae.

Distribution
Grasshopper species in this genus are recorded mainland Europe (including Norway, but not the British Isles), the eastern Palearctic realm through to temperate, east Asia including Japan.

Species
Podisma aberrans Ikonnikov, 1911
Podisma amedegnatoae Fontana & Pozzebon, 2007
Podisma cantabricae Morales-Agacino, 1950
Podisma carpetana Bolívar, 1898
Podisma eitschbergeri Harz, 1973
Podisma emiliae Ramme, 1926
Podisma goidanichi Baccetti, 1959
Podisma hesperus Hebard, 1936
Podisma kanoi Storozhenko, 1994
Podisma lezgina Uvarov, 1917
Podisma magdalenae Galvagni, 1971
Podisma miramae Savenko, 1941
Podisma pedestris Linnaeus, 1758 - type species (as Gryllus pedestris L. = P. pedestris pedestris)
Podisma ruffoi Baccetti, 1971
Podisma sapporensis Shiraki, 1910
Podisma satunini Uvarov, 1916
Podisma silvestrii Salfi, 1935
Podisma syriaca Brunner von Wattenwyl, 1861
Podisma teberdina Ramme, 1951
Podisma tyatiensis Bugrov & Sergeev, 1997
Podisma uvarovi Ramme, 1926

References

Acrididae genera
Melanoplinae